Ochthebius is a genus of minute moss beetles in the family Hydraenidae. There are at least 460 described species in Ochthebius.

See also
 List of Ochthebius species

References

Further reading

External links

 

Staphylinoidea
Articles created by Qbugbot